Luxe may refer to:
 Luxé, commune in the Charente department in southwestern France.
 Luxe (app), on-demand parking mobile application